Maxime Farazijn (born 2 June 1994 in Ypres) is a Belgian cyclist, who currently rides for Belgian amateur team Wielerteam Decock–Van Eyck–Van Mosel Devos–Capoen. He is the son of former professional cyclist Peter Farazijn.

Major results

2014
 5th Grand Prix Criquielion
2015
 1st Brussels–Opwijk
 3rd Overall Le Triptyque des Monts et Châteaux
1st Stage 4
 3rd Paris–Tours Espoirs
 5th Paris–Roubaix Espoirs
 6th Omloop Het Nieuwsblad Beloften
 9th Kattekoers
2017
 9th Ronde van Drenthe
2019
 5th Grand Prix de la Somme
 8th Overall Ronde de l'Oise

References

External links

1994 births
Living people
Belgian male cyclists
Sportspeople from Ypres
Cyclists from West Flanders
21st-century Belgian people